Case Histories is a British crime drama television series based on the Jackson Brodie novel series by Kate Atkinson. It stars Jason Isaacs, who has also narrated the abridged audiobook adaptation, as protagonist Jackson Brodie. The series is both set and filmed in Edinburgh. Initially each episode was aired in two 60 minute sections. The first series premiered on 5 June 2011, on BBC1 in the United Kingdom, and in October 2011 on PBS in the United States. A second series aired in 2013. Initially commissioned as two feature-length episodes, in September 2012, the BBC reported that the format of series two would be different, encompassing three self- contained stories, at a running time of ninety minutes per episode. The first episode was revealed to be an adaptation of Atkinson's 2010 novel Started Early, Took My Dog. Filming for the second series commenced in October 2012. The second and third episodes of the series are original stories, written exclusively for television.

Plot

Private investigator Jackson Brodie (Jason Isaacs), a former soldier and policeman, hides a deeply empathetic heart under his tough-guy exterior. He is unable to resist coming to the rescue and is a magnet for the bereaved, the lost and the dysfunctional. Intriguing, moving and funny, the character-driven stories conjure up a richly imagined world in which Brodie attempts to bring resolution to the victims of unexplained mysteries and comfort to the survivors of personal tragedies. He is the ultimate survivor himself—a bruised optimist, compelled to help others. Assisted by his faithful colleague Louise Munroe (Amanda Abbington), Jackson attempts to provide answers to those without hope of ever finding them any other way.

Cast
Jason Isaacs as Jackson Brodie
Amanda Abbington as D.I. Louise Munroe
Zawe Ashton as Deborah Arnold
Millie Innes as Marlee Brodie
Natasha Little as Julia Land
Kirsty Mitchell as Josie Brodie 
Edward Corrie as Marcus Stewart
Martin Stevenson as Archie Munroe 
Rory Barraclough as Young Jackson Brodie
Allan Linsday as Francis Brodie
Paterson Joseph as Patrick Carter
Tessa Titterington as Young Amelia
Morven Christie as Michelle Moore

Episodes

Series 1 (2011)

Series 2 (2013)

In the United States, series 2 was broadcast on 12, 19 and 26 October 2013.

References

External links

Case Histories on PBS, as part of Masterpiece Mystery!

BBC television dramas
2010s Scottish television series
2011 Scottish television series debuts
2013 Scottish television series endings
Edinburgh in fiction
English-language television shows
Television shows based on British novels
Television shows set in Scotland
Television shows set in Edinburgh
2010s British crime television series
2010s British drama television series
British detective television series